Marcelo Felipe Hernández (born 10 February 1990) is a Filipino cyclist, who currently rides for UCI Continental team .

Major results

2015
 National Road Championships
3rd Road race
3rd Time trial
 6th Overall Tour of Borneo
 10th Overall Jelajah Malaysia
2016
 4th Overall Tour of Thailand
 5th Overall Tour de Filipinas
 6th Overall Tour de Banyuwangi Ijen
 7th Overall Jelajah Malaysia
 7th Tour de Jakarta
 8th Overall Tour de Flores
 9th Overall Tour de Singkarak
2017
 3rd Overall Tour de Flores
 9th Overall Tour de Singkarak
 10th Overall Jelajah Malaysia
2018
 3rd Road race, National Road Championships
 4th Overall Tour de Singkarak
 8th Overall Tour de Banyuwangi Ijen
 8th Overall Tour de Filipinas
2019
 1st  Overall PRUride PH
1st  Mountains classification
 1st Stage 2 Ronda Pilipinas
 3rd  Team road race, Southeast Asian Games
 7th Overall Tour of Thailand
2022
 7th Overall Tour of Thailand

References

External links

1990 births
Living people
Filipino male cyclists
Place of birth missing (living people)
Competitors at the 2019 Southeast Asian Games
Southeast Asian Games bronze medalists for the Philippines
Southeast Asian Games medalists in cycling